Mount Pleasant station is a commuter rail stop on the Metro-North Railroad's Harlem Line, located in Mount Pleasant, New York. It serves two adjacent cemeteries, Gate of Heaven and Kensico, the latter of which had its own station until the mid-1980s. There is one train in each direction on weekdays and three trains in each direction on weekends. The station exists largely for visitors of those buried in the cemetery, in turn there is no parking available at the station and it is not intended as a commuter station.

The station is located in the Zone 5 Metro-North fare zone.

On February 3, 2015, the Valhalla train crash occurred south of the station, in which a Metro-North train crashed into a Mercedes-Benz SUV at Commerce Street near the Taconic State Parkway. The crash caused 6 deaths and at least 15 injuries, including 7 serious injuries.

The station is the least used station on Metro-North, with only 13 passengers per week in 2018.

Station layout
 The station has two offset high-level side platforms, each about 50 feet long, and can fit half a car. They are accessible to only one door of a train. When trains stop here, usually the first or last car receives and discharges passengers.

References

External links

 Station from Stevens Avenue from Google Maps Street View
 Open canopy installed over one of the platforms (Panoramio)

Metro-North Railroad stations in New York (state)
Railway stations in Westchester County, New York
Transportation in Westchester County, New York